Rachel Hood (born September 1953) is an English classic-winning thoroughbred racehorse owner.

Biography
Hood has owned numerous race horses, including St. Leger Stakes winner Arctic Cosmos,  Cheshire Oaks winner Gertrude Bell and Nichols Canyon.

She is an English and American-qualified attorney, and practiced in the State of California. She met her husband, racehorse trainer John Gosden, whilst they were both students at the University of Cambridge. She is currently Chairwoman of the Racehorse Owners Association. She has four children, Sebastian, Serena, Theodora and Thaddeus. She lives in Newmarket, Suffolk.

She currently serves as a Conservative Party councillor in Newmarket.

References

1953 births
British racehorse owners and breeders
Living people
Place of birth missing (living people)
English lawyers
American lawyers
Alumni of the University of Cambridge
People from Newmarket, Suffolk
Conservative Party (UK) councillors